Decherd can refer to:

 Robert Decherd (born 1951), American businessman involved with various news companies
 Decherd, Tennessee, a city in Franklin County, Tennessee, United States
 Decherd Turner, American academic